Halomonas hamiltonii is a halophilic bacteria first isolated from the environment surrounding dialysis patients. It is closely related to H. magadiensis.

References

Further reading
Kim, Kwang Kyu, et al. "Halomonas stevensii sp. nov., Halomonas hamiltonii sp. nov. and Halomonas johnsoniae sp. nov., isolated from a renal care centre." International Journal of Systematic and Evolutionary Microbiology 60.2 (2010): 369–377.
Sánchez-Porro, Cristina, et al. "Halomonas titanicae sp. nov., a halophilic bacterium isolated from the RMS Titanic." International Journal of Systematic and Evolutionary Microbiology 60.12 (2010): 2768–2774.

External links

LPSN
Type strain of Halomonas hamiltonii at BacDive -  the Bacterial Diversity Metadatabase

Oceanospirillales
Bacteria described in 2009